Esther Everett Lape (8 October 1881 – 17 May 1981) was a well-known American journalist, researcher, and publicist. She was associated with the Women's Trade Union League and was one of the founders of the League of Women Voters.

Her life-partner, Elizabeth Read, was her personal attorney and financial advisor.

Career
Esther Lape taught English at Swarthmore College, the University of Arizona, Columbia University, and Barnard College.

She was an activist of the Women's Trade Union League and one of the founders of the League of Women Voters.

Lape was the director of the American Foundation for Studies in Government of which her partner, Elizabeth Fisher Read, was director of research.

In the 1920s and 1930s she led an unsuccessful battle for United States participation in the World Court.

Lape edited a book on expert medical testimony, Medical Research: A Midcentury Survey (1955), sponsored by the American Foundation. In 1923 she collaborated with Read and Gustav Frenssen to Klaus Hinrich Baas: The Story Of A Self-made Man.... Together with Read, Lape published the journal City, State and Nation.

Personal life
Esther Everett Lape was born on October 8, 1881, in Wilmington, Delaware. She attended public school in Philadelphia, then Bryn Mawr College and Wellesley College. Esther Lape lived with Elizabeth Fisher Read, Women's Suffrage activist and Eleanor Roosevelt's lawyer and friend, in Greenwich Village, at 20 East 11th Street, where today a plaque said Eleanor Roosevelt lived here when she was first lady. The building was actually owned by Lape. Roosevelt, who had met Lape through Read in 1920, rented an apartment for a time. Nearby, at 171 West 12th Street, lived other lesbian couples involved in the Woman's Suffrage movement and of the close-knit circle of friends of Roosevelt: Marion Dickerman and Nancy Cook, Molly Dewson and Polly Porter, Grace Hutchins and Anna Rochester. Lape, with her life partner, Read, and other Roosevelt's female friends, was part of Roosevelt's support network of female friends.

Lape and Read also owned a country house, Salt Meadow, Westbrook, Connecticut, where Roosevelt was often a guest. In 1972, after Read's death, Lape donated Salt Meadow to the U.S. Fish and Wildlife Service. The estate is currently the Stewart B. McKinney National Wildlife Refuge. Refuge staff are working on a submission for National Register of Historical Places recognition for the former Salt Meadow estate that will recognize the same-sex relationship of Lape and Read.

Esther Everett Lape died on May 17, 1981, in New York City, at 99 years old.

References

1881 births
1981 deaths
Schoolteachers from Delaware
20th-century American women educators
American feminists
Lesbian feminists
LGBT people from Delaware
20th-century American educators
Bryn Mawr College alumni
Wellesley College alumni
Barnard College faculty
Columbia University faculty
University of Arizona faculty
Swarthmore College faculty
American women academics